Miljuschka Lola Witzenhausen (born 10 July 1985) is a Dutch model, actress and television presenter.

Career 
From 2005 to 2007, Witzenhausen was a video jockey on the music channel TMF. Since 2008, she has appeared in the BNN soap opera . Since 2006, she has also been an ambassador for the Dance4Life AIDS awareness initiative.

In the 2010s, Witzenhausen became active as a TV cook, presenting cooking shows on 24Kitchen and making regular appearances in lifestyle programmes, such as RTL Boulevard. In 2020, she was a participant in the twentieth season of the popular television show . She has been an ambassador for WW International since 2020.

In 2022, she appeared in the television show The Masked Singer.

Personal life 
Witzenhausen's maternal uncle is the notorious Dutch criminal Willem Holleeder.
She divorced artist Tycho Veldhoen in 2015.
She has 2 children, one of which has epilepsy.

References 

1985 births
Living people
Dutch female models
Dutch television actresses
Actresses from Amsterdam
Dutch soap opera actresses
21st-century Dutch women